is a railway station located in the town of Fujisaki, Aomori Prefecture, Japan, operated by the East Japan Railway Company (JR East).

Lines

Station layout
Fujisaki Station has one ground-level island platform, but only a single track is in use, serving bidirectional traffic. The station is unattended.

History
Fujisaki Station was opened on September 25, 1918 as a station on the Mutsu Railway. It became a station on the Japan National Railways (JNR) when the Mutsu Railway was nationalized on June 1, 1927. With the privatization of the JNR on April 1, 1987, it came under the operational control of JR East. The station has been unattended since 2001.

Surrounding area

Fujisaki town hall
Fujisaki Post Office

See also
 List of Railway Stations in Japan

References

External links

   

Stations of East Japan Railway Company
Railway stations in Aomori Prefecture
Gonō Line
Ajigasawa, Aomori
Railway stations in Japan opened in 1918